Ghost Community was a British progressive rock band. It was formed in 2015, and was composed of John Paul Vaughan, Simon Rogers, Moray Macdonald, Jake Bradford-Sharp, and Matty Cohen.

They released one album called Cycle of Life in 2016.

In March 2019, the band announced that they were splitting up.

References

British progressive rock groups
Musical groups established in 2015
2015 establishments in the United Kingdom
Musical groups disestablished in 2019
2019 disestablishments in the United Kingdom